Oscar Joaquín Velazquez Elvira (born 11 September 1975) is a Mexican former professional footballer who played as a defender.

Early life

He was born in Veracruz, Mexico on 8 November 1975, his father Joaquín Velázquez senior was a massage therapist, for Veracruz. He would join Veracruz youth system as a child and would later go on to join the Puebla FC youth system in 1992 where he finished his development.

Career 

He made his professional debut with Puebla on 27 August 1995 in a 2–1 loss against Toros Neza. He spent two years with the club before being sent out on loan to Santos Laguna where he played 14 games before returning to Puebla where he played from 1998 to 2004. In 1999 with Puebla he experienced relegation for the first time and is still remembered by the clubs' fans for an emotional moment right after the referee ended the match that sealed the clubs' first relegation in more than 60 years. In 2004, he was sent on loan to the club's second division side BUAP where he played 65 games and scored three goals. In 2006 after Puebla's second relegation he rejoined the club and was key in helping the club return to the first division. In 2008 in a match against Pachuca he suffered a nose injury after smashing his face into an opponents' head right after scoring a goal. In 2010 after internal problems with the new owners he was sent on paid leave and wouldn't return to the club.

On 26 February 2013, Major League Soccer club Chivas USA announced they had signed Velázquez along with Peruvian defender Walter Vílchez, reuniting with their former coach at Puebla FC José Luis Sánchez Solá.

Personal life 
Around 7pm on April 12, 2022, Velázquez was arrested on the Anillo Periférico while on his way to Cruz Azul's second-leg match of the 2022 CONCACAF Champions League semi-final. The arrest was a result of a "judicial process initiated against him in 2018". The club released a statement the day after announcing Velázquez would no longer be with the institution.

Honours
Primera A (1) 2006–2007
Promotion (1) 2007

References

External links

1975 births
Living people
Mexican expatriate footballers
Mexican footballers
Club Puebla players
Santos Laguna footballers
Lobos BUAP footballers
C.D. Veracruz footballers
Chivas USA players
Expatriate soccer players in the United States
Liga MX players
Major League Soccer players
Association football defenders
Club Puebla non-playing staff
Deportivo Toluca F.C. non-playing staff